is an installment in the Sega AM2 Virtua Fighter fighting game series. A super deformed version of Virtua Fighter 2, it was released in the arcade and on the Sega Saturn in 1996. Unlike Virtua Fighter 2, it was developed on the ST-V board.

All the characters have big heads, and the music is at a faster pace. The gameplay itself is slightly tweaked from Virtua Fighter 2. The Saturn version includes some new FMVs and programmable button sequences to allow players to test and use pre-made combos. Despite being children, some of the fighters retain the adult characteristics of their Virtua Fighter 2 counterparts, such as facial hair, muscles, and breasts.

Release
Merchandise for the game in Japan included a line of stuffed toys which sold very well even before development on the game was finished.

In Japan, Virtua Fighter Kids was released on the Saturn as a promotional item in co-operation with drink brands "Java Tea" and "Energen" under the title "Virtua Fighter Kids: Java Tea Original Edition". It was later released commercially without any mention of "Java Tea" on the cover. All Java Tea product placement was removed from the western versions of the game, but is present in all Japanese versions (arcade, regular and Java Edition).

Appearances in other games
Although no official sequels to Virtua Fighter Kids were ever made (other than the VF Kids versions of the CG Portrait Series in Japan called the Game Gear Portrait Series), the child versions of Akira Yuki and Sarah Bryant reappear as playable characters in Fighters Megamix, and some of their fellow playable characters appear in the game's ending movie as well. The Kid styles of Akira Yuki and Sarah Bryant were made into figures in the Sega Dreamcast game Shenmue.

Reception

In Japan, Game Machine listed Virtua Fighter Kids on their May 1, 1996 issue as being the third most-successful arcade game of the month.

Virtua Fighter Kids divided reviewers to an extent. GameSpot, Scary Larry of GamePro, and Dan Hsu, Crispin Boyer, and Sushi-X of Electronic Gaming Monthly said that while Virtua Fighter Kids would have made an amusing bonus mode in Virtua Fighter 2, it was not worthwhile as a full-price standalone release. On the other side, Next Generation, Rich Leadbetter of Sega Saturn Magazine, and Shawn Smith of Electronic Gaming Monthly argued that features such as the funny cinemas, the new facial expressions on the characters, and the new kid-themed scenery make the game more than a money-making gimmick, though they also said that it is not as good as the original version of Virtua Fighter 2. Most reviewers criticized the short reach of the kid characters.

Notes

References

External links

1996 video games
Arcade video games
Video games developed in Japan
Sega-AM2 games
Sega arcade games
Sega Saturn games
Virtua Fighter